The Sunbury Earth Rings are prehistoric Aboriginal sites located on the hills to the west of Jacksons Creek near Sunbury, Victoria, Australia.

Description and identification
The Sunbury earth rings were formed by scraping off grass and topsoil, and piling it in a circular ridge around the outside. They measure between 10 – 25 m diameter. Three of the rings are in close proximity and two others several kilometres away. All are on gently sloping sites. They are somewhat different from the Bora Rings found in New South Wales and southeast Queensland, which tend to be located in hidden, flat sites, and in connected pairs. The Sunbury Earth Rings first came to public attention, and first were investigated and described in the early 1970s, when archaeologist Dr. David Frankel undertook a test excavation on one of the rings to determine their origin. Excavations revealed the remains of two small stone cairns, one in the centre and one on the edge of the circle, and a number of sharp stone plades or knives, which may have been used in ritual scarification or circumcision ceremonies.

Interpretation
The rings have been interpreted as Aboriginal ceremonial sites, although there are no historical or ethnographic accounts of them being used as such.  Members of the Wurundjeri Tribe Council have suggested the rings may be more than 1000 years old, based on the results of archaeological investigations, and that the group of three may have related to separate male and female ceremonies and initiation rituals. However, elder Auntie Annette Xibberas acknowledged that the Aboriginal people of the Melbourne area, "...lost a lot of our knowledge with European colonisation, we only found out about these (rings) about 30 years ago".

Management and conservation

Some of the Rings have been put under the management of the Wurundjeri Tribe Land and Compensation Cultural Heritage Council, and have also been included on the Register of the National Estate.

There are ongoing pressures on the sites from development. As a result of housing development along Reservoir Road, one ring in Fullwood Drive is now encircled by the back fences of adjoining houses, while another is subject to residential subdivision plans which will also see it surrounded by roads. A past proposal even considered incorporating one of the rings in the middle of a traffic round-about. The Canterbury Hills housing estate has submitted plans for residential development around the Riddells Road ring. In October 2009, the Sunbury Maribyrnong Valley Green Wedge Defenders made a Submission to the Parliamentary, Legislative Council regarding their inquiry into the impact of the state government’s decision to change the Urban Growth Boundary, citing the Aboriginal ring as a significant element of the threatened Bundanoon woodlands and grasslands, which was being encroached upon by housing.

Views of the rings c2004

Geographical location

 Riddells Road Ring 
 Hopbush Ave 
 Correa Way 
 Wirilda Court 
 Fullwood Drive Ring

See also
Wurundjeri

References

Archaeological sites in Victoria (Australia)
Paleoanthropological sites
Australian Aboriginal cultural history
Sunbury, Victoria